Twin Branch is an unincorporated community in McDowell County, West Virginia, United States. It was founded by Henry Ford as a mining community.

The community was named for the fact two streams meet at the town site.

References

Unincorporated communities in McDowell County, West Virginia
Unincorporated communities in West Virginia
Mining communities in West Virginia
Coal towns in West Virginia